José Ángel Rodrigo Palomino Ortiz (born 22 July 1973) is an Australian former soccer midfielder, who played nine years in Belgium.

Career
Palomino played in Australia for Granville Waratah, Belmore Hercules and in Belgium for KSV Waregem, RC Tournai, Wawel Kraków in Poland and Royal Racing Club Touraisien and Francs Borains in Belgium again.

Personal life
He was born in Spain to Chilean parents and is of Australian heritage.

References

External links
 
 Rodrigo Palomino at PlaymakerStats.com

1973 births
Living people
People from Alicante
Australian soccer players
Australian people of Chilean descent
Sportspeople of Chilean descent
Australian people of Spanish descent
Sportspeople of Spanish descent
Association football midfielders
Australian expatriate soccer players
Australian expatriate sportspeople in Belgium
Australian expatriate sportspeople in Poland
Expatriate footballers in Belgium
Expatriate footballers in Poland
K.S.V. Waregem players
Francs Borains players
Wawel Kraków players